Carlos Garabet Avedissian (born 7 June 1959) is a Uruguayan football manager.

Coaching career

FAS
In November 2000, Avedissian signed with FAS of the top flight Primera División for the Apertura 2000, replacing Roberto Abrussezze. He left the club in April 2001, being replaced by Rubén Guevara.

Atlético Balboa
Avedissian signed with Atlético Balboa for the Apertura 2003.

Sonsonate
In May 2017, he signed as new coach of Sonsonate for the Apertura 2017, replacing Eraldo Correia. In August 2017, he left the club after a 0–1 defeat against Pasaquina and was replaced by Rubén Alonso.

References

External links
https://www.thefinalball.com/treinador.php?id=6924
http://www.concacaf.com/article/avedissian-leaves-costa-rica-womens-post

1959 births
Living people
Uruguayan football managers
Expatriate football managers in El Salvador
C.D. FAS managers
Sportspeople from Montevideo
Uruguayan people of Armenian descent
20th-century Uruguayan people
21st-century Uruguayan people